Rønnow is a Danish surname. Notable people with the surname include:

Anders Rønnow Klarlund (born 1971) Danish author, director, and screenwriter
Frederik Rønnow (born 1992), Danish footballer
Mikkel Rønnow (born 1974), Danish musician

Danish-language surnames